The second Battle of Nördlingen (or Battle of Allerheim) was fought on August 3, 1645 southeast of Nördlingen near the village of Alerheim. France and its Protestant German allies defeated the forces of the Holy Roman Empire and its Bavarian ally.

Prelude
The Imperials and their main German ally Bavaria were facing increasingly severe pressure in the war from the French, Swedes and their Protestant allies and were struggling to prevent a French attempt to advance into Bavaria.

Geography
The 16,000-man Imperial-Bavarian army, led by Field Marshal Franz Baron von Mercy and Johann von Werth entrenched on rising ground near the village of Alerheim, 10 km southeast of Nordlingen. One km to the northeast of the village, the ridge rises to a height called the Wennenberg. Exactly 1 km to the southwest of the village is the Schloss Alerheim, which crowns a hill. Mercy and Werth deployed their right wing on the Wennenberg, anchored their left wing on the schloss (castle) hill, and posted their center on the low ridge between the wings. In the 17th century, Alerheim was smaller and entirely to the northwest of the Imperial battleline between the Wennenberg and the schloss. To protect their weak center, the Bavarian and Imperial officers had some dismounted dragoons and foot soldiers barricade themselves in the village. They hoped to defeat the French by forcing them into a disadvantageous attack uphill into the fire of the Imperial cannon.

Battle
Before the battle, Marshal Henri, Vicomte de Turenne united his Franco-German army with an all-French army led by the Duc d'Enghien (who succeeded as the Prince de Condé from 1646 onward) and 6,000 Hessians commanded by Johann von Geyso. The combined army of 17,000 men was placed under Enghien's overall leadership. Enghien's tactics were brutally simple. He intended to launch the French troops in a frontal charge on the Imperial positions. Meanwhile, it took the French army from noon until 4:00 pm to arrange its lines for battle.

In the event, the Imperial army counterattacked almost at once. Charging downhill from Schloss Alerheim, they broke Enghien's hesitant right wing, forcing the Frenchman to call off his attack on the Imperial center. On the other end of the field, Turenne hammered at the Wennenberg. When the Wennenberg fell, the defeated Imperial right swung back and the victorious left wheeled forward, so that the Imperials faced north instead of northwest. Mercy was killed during the savage fighting. By evening, both armies were still on the field of battle. However, in the darkness and confusion, the Imperials in the village, believing themselves to be surrounded, capitulated. Later that night, the Imperial army conceded defeat and withdrew to Donauwörth.

Result
The Franco-German losses were 4,000 killed, wounded, and captured, including the capture of Marshal Gramont and the death of 3 colonels, along with 70 flags. The Bavarian-Imperial army suffered similar losses. The French were able to subsequently capture the cities of Nördlingen and Dinkelsbühl but Enghien fell sick while sieging Heilbronn. Turenne was left in command and abandoned the siege in front of the numerical superior Imperial-Bavarian army that gained reinforcements from Bohemia by Archduke Leopold Wilhelm. The French Marshal eventually fell back to Philippsburg. Therefore, the only French gain from the bloody victory was their capture of Nördlingen and Dinkelsbühl. Bavaria was at least temporarily safe. Eventually the battle provided no more than a breathing space and did not prevent the invasion of Bavaria the following year.

In 2008 archaeologists dug up a mass grave of 50 skeletons, most-likely French soldiers, just outside the town of Alerheim.

References

Eggenberger, David. An Encyclopedia of Battles. New York: Dover Publications, 1985.

Footnotes

1645 in the Holy Roman Empire
Conflicts in 1645
Battles of the Thirty Years' War
Battles involving the Holy Roman Empire
Battles involving France
Battles involving Bavaria
Battles in Bavaria
Nördlingen